Andrew Jacob Cave (born December 4, 1992) is an American professional baseball outfielder for the Philadelphia Phillies of Major League Baseball (MLB). He made his MLB debut with the Minnesota Twins in 2018.

Amateur career
Cave attended Hampton Christian High School in Hampton, Virginia. As a pitcher for the school's baseball team in his sophomore year, Cave had a 10–0 win–loss record and a 1.23 earned run average with 109 strikeouts in 61 innings pitched. He also demonstrated his hitting ability winning the 
World Wooden Bat Association Under-16 national title. He committed to attend Louisiana State University on a college baseball scholarship. Before his junior year, he transferred to Kecoughtan High School. He also played basketball in high school. In 2011, his senior year at Kecoughtan, he had a .609 batting average. Cave was named the Peninsula District and Daily Press Player of the Year. He spent the summer after graduating from Kecoughtan playing for the Peninsula Pilots of the Coastal Plain League.

Professional career

New York Yankees
The New York Yankees selected Cave in the sixth round, with the 209th overall selection, of the 2011 MLB draft. He signed with the Yankees, receiving a $825,000 signing bonus. He made his professional debut that season for the Gulf Coast Yankees. In his first game, he fractured his kneecap in a collision at home plate. The injury caused him to miss the rest of the season as well as the entire 2012 season.

In 2013, Cave played 113 games for the Charleston RiverDogs of the Class A South Atlantic League. He finished the year hitting .282/.347/.401 with two home runs and 31 RBIs. Cave started the 2014 season with the Tampa Yankees of the Class A-Advanced Florida State League. After hitting .304/.354/.395 with three home runs and 24 RBIs in 90 games with Tampa, he was promoted to the Trenton Thunder of the Class AA Eastern League in July, where he finished the season batting .273 with four home runs and 18 RBIs in 42 games.

Cave spent 2015 with both Trenton and the Scranton/Wilkes-Barre RailRiders of the Class AAA International League, compiling a combined .278 batting average with two home runs and 39 RBIs. He was selected by the Cincinnati Reds in the 2015 Rule 5 draft. Cave did not make the Reds' Opening Day roster, and he was returned to the Yankees on April 5, 2016. In 2016, he played for Trenton and Scranton/Wilkes-Barre, posting a combined .268 batting average with eight home runs and 55 RBIs, and in 2017, he returned to both the Thunder and RailRiders, batting a combined .305 with 20 home runs and 56 RBIs.

The Yankees added Cave to their 40-man roster after the 2017 season. He was designated for assignment on March 12, 2018, following the Yankees signing of Neil Walker.

Minnesota Twins
The Minnesota Twins acquired Cave on March 16, 2018, for minor league pitcher Luis Gil. He began the season with the Rochester Red Wings of the International League, and made his MLB debut on May 19. He hit his first major league home run in his first major league game. During the 2018 season, Cave hit 13 home runs and led all Major League Baseball hitters in average distance per home run, at 421 feet.

On May 13, 2019, Cave was sent down to the minor leagues. On the season, Cave hit .258 with eight home runs and 25 RBI. He was added to the playoff roster for the 2019 postseason. In 2020, Cave hit .221 with four home runs and 15 RBI in the COVID-19 shortened season.

On May 15, 2021, Cave was placed on the 60-day injured list after suffering a fracture in his back. Cave was activated off of the injured list on July 24. On November 25, 2021, the Twins outrighted Cave to the St. Paul Saints. He had his contract selected on August 1, 2022.

Philadelphia Phillies
The Baltimore Orioles claimed Cave off of waivers on October 12, 2022. The Philadelphia Phillies claimed Cave off waivers from the Orioles on December 2.

Personal life
Cave's father, Bryan, played baseball at Kecoughtan and became the head coach of The Apprentice School. Both of Cave's sisters played softball and were named All-District.

References

External links

Living people
1992 births
Sportspeople from Hampton, Virginia
Baseball players from Virginia
Major League Baseball outfielders
Minnesota Twins players
Gulf Coast Yankees players
Charleston RiverDogs players
Tampa Yankees players
Trenton Thunder players
Scranton/Wilkes-Barre RailRiders players
Rochester Red Wings players
St. Paul Saints players